A ring of stone or stone ring or variation, may refer to:

Structures and geomorphology
 stone circle (disambiguation), various large circular rings made of stone arrangements
 Ring of Stones, a 1656 shipwreck marker near Perth, WA, Australia
 Ring of Stone, castlework fortifications barrier used to conquer the Welsh by the English
 stone ring, a type of naturally occurring patterned ground
 kerb or ring of stone, used for gallery graves

Other uses
 Ring (jewelry), made of stone, or precious stones
 ringstone, artefacts made of stone in the shape of rings

See also

 Stone (disambiguation)
 Ring (disambiguation)
 Henge, neolithic structures